Hamra:  Al-Ḥamrāʾ means "the red one" in Arabic. It may refer to:

Places

Israel
 Al-Hamra', a depopulated  Arab village near Safad
 Al-Hamra, Baysan, a depopulated  Arab village near Baysan

Lebanon
 Hamra, Beirut, a neighborhood
 Hamra Street, a street in Beirut known as Rue Hamra or "Beirut's Champs Elysées"

Oman
Al Hamra, Oman, a historic town

Saudi Arabia
Al Hamra', Al Madinah
Al Hamra, Riyadh

Spain
Alhambra (Al-Hamra in Arabic), a fortress and palace in Andalusia

Syria
Al-Hamraa, a town in the vicinity of Hama
Al-Hamra, al-Suqaylabiyah, a town in the al-Suqaylabiyah District

Sweden
 Hamra, Gotland, a settlement
 Hamra formation, a Silurian sedimentary rock formation on the island of Gotland
 Hamra National Park

West Bank 
 Hamra, Bik'at HaYarden, an Israeli settlement

Yemen
Bayt al-Hamra', a village in Sanaa Governorate

Other uses
 9373 Hamra, a main-belt asteroid
 Battle of Hamra al-Asad, a battle in 625 AD (3 AH) in which the Islamic prophet Muhammad participated
 Hamra (Mandaeism), water mixed with mashed raisins that is used in Mandaean rituals

See also
 Alhambra (disambiguation)
 Al Jazirah Al Hamra, United Arab Emirates